The 2009 Toyota/Save Mart 350 was a NASCAR Sprint Cup Series event held on June 21, 2009 at Infineon Raceway in Sonoma, California. Kasey Kahne picked up his first-ever win on a road course after leading 37 laps, giving car owner Richard Petty his first win as an owner in 10 years. All of Petty's cars finished in the top 10, except for Reed Sorenson, who finished a distant 40th.

Race results

Failed to Qualify: Scott Speed (#82), Tom Hubert (#27), Chris Cook (#37), Brian Simo (#36)

* Scott Speed's team paid Joe Nemechek to let Speed drive his car in the race.

References

Toyota/Save Mart 350
Toyota/Save Mart 350
NASCAR races at Sonoma Raceway
June 2009 sports events in the United States